Joan R. Ginther is an American lottery winner.

Description
Joan Ginther is an American four-time lottery winner.  She first won the lottery in 1993, when she won  in Lotto Texas (equivalent to about $M in ).  Her next win came in 2006 when she won $2 million in the Holiday Millionaire scratch-off. Her third win happened in 2008, when she won $3 million from a Millions and Millions ticket. In 2010, she won $10 million, her largest prize yet, bringing her total winnings to $20.4 million. According to mathematicians asked by the Associated Press, the odds of winning this many times were one in 18 times 10 to the power 24, but this is apparently a miscalculation. All of her winning tickets were purchased in Texas, and two of them were bought from the same convenience store in Bishop, Texas. She currently resides in Las Vegas, Nevada, and prefers to keep a low profile.

See also
Lotteries in the United States

References

living people
lottery winners
people from Las Vegas
people from Texas
place of birth missing (living people)
year of birth missing (living people)